Sandy Kenyon (born Sanford Klein; August 5, 1922 – February 20, 2010) was an American actor of film and television. He appeared as a guest actor on numerous television series, including a recurring role on The Americans. He was also the original voice of Jon Arbuckle, voicing the character in the first Garfield special Here Comes Garfield.

Early years
Kenyon was born in The Bronx, New York, and served as a pilot in the U.S. Army Air Forces during World War II.

Career
Kenyon co-starred as Des Smith in the syndicated television drama Crunch and Des (1956) and portrayed Cashbox Potter in the syndicated adventure series Major Del Conway of the Flying Tigers (1953). Among the many television series in which he guest starred are the westerns: The Rifleman, Colt .45, Yancy Derringer, Have Gun-Will Travel, The Tall Man, Gunsmoke, and Bonanza.

In 1960, Kenyon was cast as a pre-presidential Abraham Lincoln in the episode "No Bridge on the River" of the NBC western series, Riverboat. In the story line, Grey Holden (Darren McGavin) sues the railroad when his vessel, the Enterprise, strikes a rail bridge atop the Mississippi River on a dark, stormy night; Lincoln is the attorney representing the railroad. Tyler McVey is cast as a judge and Denver Pyle as Jim Bledsoe.

In 1961, Kenyon was cast in the role of Ritter on The Americans, a 17-episode NBC series about how the American Civil War divided families.

In the 1963-1964 season, Kenyon was cast as Shep Baggott in a recurring role in five episodes of the ABC western series, The Travels of Jaimie McPheeters.

Other series in which Kenyon appeared include: Richard Diamond, Private Detective; The Fugitive; Room for One More; All in the Family; Gunsmoke; The Dick Van Dyke Show (including the 2004 reunion special "159th Episode"); That Girl; The Partridge Family; Hogan's Heroes; Adam-12; Kung Fu; Peter Gunn; Quincy, M.E.; Knots Landing; Designing Women and The Twilight Zone. 

In the film MacArthur (1977), he portrays General Jonathan M. Wainwright, who survived spending most of World War II in a Japanese POW camp. His other films included Al Capone (1959); Easy Come, Easy Go (1967); Tom Sawyer (1973); Breezy (1973); When Time Ran Out (1980); The Loch Ness Horror (1981); Lifepod (1981); and Down on Us (1989).

He voiced Jon Arbuckle in the first Garfield animated television special, Here Comes Garfield.

Stage productions
Kenyon performed in the world premiere stage production of Edna St. Vincent Millay's Conversation at Midnight in Los Angeles, in 1961, in a cast that included James Coburn, Jack Albertson, Eduard Franz and John Marley.  The play opened at the Coronet Theatre, but was so successful that after two months it moved to the larger 550-seat Civic Playhouse, running for 6 months altogether.  Robert Gist directed the production by Worley Thorne in association with Susan Davis.  Three years later, Gist and Thorne re-created the production, which again included Kenyon, in Broadway's Billy Rose Theatre, where—under-financed, unable to afford promotion, or wait for word-of-mouth to kick in,  and lacking the charisma and virtuoso acting of James Coburn—it ran for just eight previews and four performances.  Kenyon also appeared in regional theatre in Los Angeles.

Death
Kenyon died of kidney cancer at the age of 87 at his home in Los Angeles.

Filmography

Film

Television

See also

References

External links
 
 
 

1922 births
2010 deaths
Male actors from New York City
American male stage actors
American male film actors
American male television actors
American male voice actors
Jewish American male actors
Male actors from Los Angeles
United States Army Air Forces personnel of World War II
21st-century American Jews